Guy Dayan (born August 20, 1986) is an Israeli football player playing for Hapoel Qalansawe.

Career
Guy Dayan began his career by Hapoel Beit She'an, after that he played for Hapoel Kfar Saba and in 2009 he moved to Maccabi Ahi Nazareth. He spent the 2010–11 season with Hapoel Petah Tikva before joining Hapoel Acre.

Position
He plays as central midfielder, in attacking midfield or defensive midfield.

References

1986 births
Living people
Israeli footballers
Hapoel Beit She'an F.C. players
Hapoel Kfar Saba F.C. players
Maccabi Ahi Nazareth F.C. players
Hapoel Petah Tikva F.C. players
Hapoel Acre F.C. players
Hapoel Afula F.C. players
Hapoel Nof HaGalil F.C. players
Hapoel Qalansawe F.C. players
Israeli Premier League players
Liga Leumit players
Israeli people of Moroccan-Jewish descent
Footballers from Beit She'an
Association football midfielders